William Yates Redpath (8 August 1922 – 20 January 1989) was a Scottish professional footballer who is best known for his time at Motherwell. Redpath played for Motherwell at left half, and he scored Motherwell's second goal in a 4–0 thrashing of Dundee in the 1952 Scottish Cup Final. Having lost 1–0 to Celtic in the final the year before, it was Redpath's chance to get his hands on the trophy. Redpath also represented Scotland on nine occasions and the Scottish League XI.

Career statistics

International appearances

References 

1922 births
1989 deaths
Scottish footballers
Scotland international footballers
Motherwell F.C. players
Third Lanark A.C. players
Scottish Football League players
Footballers from West Lothian
Association football wing halves
Scottish Football League representative players
Hibernian F.C. non-playing staff
Place of death missing
People from Stoneyburn